Verner Hetmar (27 October 1890 – 28 May 1962) was a Danish wrestler. He competed in the featherweight event at the 1912 Summer Olympics.

References

External links
 

1890 births
1962 deaths
Olympic wrestlers of Denmark
Wrestlers at the 1912 Summer Olympics
Danish male sport wrestlers
Sportspeople from Copenhagen
20th-century Danish people